SEFCU Arena is a 4,538-seat multi-purpose arena in Guilderland, New York. It is home to the University at Albany men's and women's Great Danes basketball teams. It is most notable for hosting the 2006 America East Conference men's basketball tournament championship, in which the Great Danes defeated Vermont, to earn their first bid into the NCAA Men's Division I Basketball Championship. The arena additionally hosted the 2009 America East men's basketball tournament, and is also a venue for the university's graduate commencement ceremonies. SEFCU Arena also can be formatted as a concert venue or to accommodate trade shows and conventions.

The arena opened in 1992, as the Recreation and Convocation Center (RACC), as part of UAlbany's transition from Division III to Division I. The current name of SEFCU Arena was adopted on November 1, 2006, when UAlbany entered a 10-year naming rights deal with the State Employees Federal Credit Union. SEFCU Arena is located behind the Physical Education building, which separates it from University Field, and sits adjacent to Bob Ford Field.

In addition to university-operated concession stands for food and beverages during events, SEFCU Arena is also the brick and mortar location of the Great Danes Team Store for athletics apparel and team merchandise.

See also
 List of NCAA Division I basketball arenas

Notes

References

External links
SEFCU Arena - UAlbanySports.com

Albany Great Danes men's basketball
Basketball venues in New York (state)
College basketball venues in the United States
Indoor arenas in New York (state)
Sports venues in Albany, New York
World TeamTennis stadiums
1992 establishments in New York (state)
Sports venues completed in 1992
Tennis venues in New York (state)